Paenarthrobacter ilicis is a bacterium species from the genus Paenarthrobacter.

This species can use L-arginine, L-asparagine, L-histidine, L-arabinose, D-galactose, D-glucose, D-ribose, Dxylose, inositol, 4-aminobutyrate, and p-hydroxybenzoate as a carbon source; it is not able to utilize L-leucine, butanediol, ormalonate.

References

External links
Type strain of Paenarthrobacter ilicis at BacDive -  the Bacterial Diversity Metadatabase

Micrococcaceae